Choiseul/Shortlands was a single-member constituency of the Governing Council of the Solomon Islands. Created in 1970 when the Governing Council was created and the number of constituencies increased from 14 to 17, it covered Choiseul Island and the Shortland Islands.

In the 1970 elections the seat was won by Remesio Eresi. It was abolished in 1973 and succeeded by Choiseul and Shortlands/Vella Lavella.

List of MPs

Election results

1970

References

Governing Council of the Solomon Islands constituencies
1970 establishments in the Solomon Islands
Constituencies established in 1970
1973 disestablishments in the Solomon Islands
Constituencies disestablished in 1973